Enterprise file synchronization and sharing (also known as EFSS and enterprise file sync and share) refers to software services that enable organizations to securely synchronize and share documents, photos, videos and files from multiple devices with employees, and external customers and partners. Organizations often adopt these technologies to prevent employees from using consumer-based file sharing apps to store, access and manage corporate data that is outside of the IT department’s control and visibility.

Key characteristics

EFSS applications are often characterized by having most or all of the following features and capabilities:

 Sync files stored in corporate storage to user desktops and devices
 Send links to large files with support for multiple file extensions and protocols
 Integration to existing business applications via APIs, plugins and mobile apps
 Built-in file creation, editing and previewing
 User access permissions to files and folders
 Protection of files stored and transferred by encryption, antivirus scanning, and DLP (data loss prevention)
 Publish links to files with the ability to set a login requirement to access data
 Authentication options for Active Directory, SAML, Azure Active Directory, etc.
 Schedule and automate file transfers from automated systems and repositories

 Audit and report file activities and system actions

Depending on what an EFSS provider offers, services can be deployed using cloud computing, on-premises, or hybrid. According to Forrester Research, some EFSS providers can provide the ability to lockdown data in certain geographies for companies that have requirements to store content/metadata in specific jurisdictions.

History
Box, one of the first EFSS products, was originally developed as a college project of Aaron Levie while he was a student of the University of Southern California in 2004. Levie left school to run the company full-time in 2005. 

In 2007 Dropbox was founded, and officially launched at 2008's TechCrunch Disrupt conference. The same year, Microsoft began beta testing of Windows Live Folders, a predecessor of OneDrive. 

Around 2010, the EFSS market emerged with over 100 vendors from a variety technology backgrounds including backup and cloud storage (Citrix ShareFile, Syncplicity), managed file transfer (Accellion, Biscom, Box, Hightail, Thru), enterprise content management and more. Many were developed as alternatives to consumer file sync and sharing services that did not have security features in place to protect company information nor the flexibility to integrate with existing content repositories and business applications.

In October 2011, software company, Citrix Systems, announced that it had acquired private enterprise file sync and share service, ShareFile, to add to the Citrix product line. ShareFile was a competitor of Box and Dropbox but focused on selling its product to IT departments of large organizations.

In 2012, CTERA Networks entered the EFSS market.

In July 2013, Forrester Research released the first “Forrester Wave” report on the EFSS market where they identified and scored products from the most significant providers.

On June 25, 2014, Google announced at its I/O Conference that it was entering the enterprise file sharing market with the release of “Google Drive for Work.”

In July 2014, Gartner Research released its first “Magic Quadrant” report on the EFSS market. The study evaluates the strengths and cautions of the most notable vendors in the industry.

In October, 2014, encrypted vendor Tresorit entered the EFSS market with Tresorit for Business. Tresorit is a competitor of Dropbox and Box, promising businesses more security and privacy compliance with End-to-end encryption. 

In April 2015, BlackBerry Limited paid between $100 million and $150 million to buy WatchDox Ltd. for its enterprise file sync and sharing capabilities.

In July 2015, one EFSS vendor, Syncplicity, was sold to private equity firm, Skyview Capital, by previous owner, EMC Corporation.

References

Cloud computing providers
Data synchronization